Paul Arnold Fryxell was an American botanist known for his work on flowering plants, especially those within the Malvaceae.

Education and career 
Fryxell attended Moline public schools and later Augustana College, graduating with a B.A. in 1949, and Iowa State University (M.S., 1951, Ph.D., 1955).  After employment with the New Mexico Agricultural Experiment Station (1952–1955) and the Wichita State University (Asst. Professor of Botany, 1955–1957), he joined the Agricultural Research Service, USDA, with which agency he spent most of his career as a Research Botanist, located on the Texas A&M University campus. He retired from this position in 1994 and became Adjunct Professor in Integrative Biology at the University of Texas at Austin.  He was also an Honorary Curator at the New York Botanical Garden.

Research 
His research interests have centered on the taxonomy of the Neotropical Malvaceae, including work on the evolution, biodiversity, and taxonomy of Gossypium, the genus that includes the world's cotton crop.  He served as president of the American Society of Plant Taxonomists (1983–1984) and of the Society for Economic Botany (1988–1989), and held a Fulbright Scholar Award for study in Argentina (1993). In 1961 he was a elected a fellow of the American Association for the Advancement of Science. He was also a fellow of the Texas Academy of Science and a member of the Commission of Flora Neotropica.

He was a contributor of treatments of the Malvaceae to numerous Neotropical floristic works and conducted fieldwork in the neotropics, primarily in Mexico but also in parts of Central and South America, as well as in tropical Australia.

In 1974, he was honoured by botanist David Martin Bates, (1934-2019), who named a monotypic genus of plants after him, Fryxellia (belonging to the family Malvaceae), comes from Mexico and Texas.

Selected publications

Personal life 
His wife Greta (Albrecht) Fryxell was an oceanographer known for her research on diatoms.

References

See also 

American botanists
1927 births
2011 deaths
Augustana College (Illinois) alumni
Iowa State University alumni